Snuff-Movie is a 2005 gothic horror film by British director Bernard Rose.

Plot
It stars Jeroen Krabbé as horror filmmaker Boris Arkadin, whose pregnant wife Mary was supposedly brutally murdered by a Manson-like gang of hippy psychopaths during the 1960s. An eccentric recluse, Boris makes a comeback when he invites some actors to a large mansion in the English countryside to 'audition' for his new film. Unknown to most of them they are being filmed by hidden cameras linked to a snuff website.

Cast
Jeroen Krabbé as Boris Arkadin / Mr. Maezel
Lisa Enos as Mary Arkardin / Wendy Jones
Teri Harrison as Pamela / Angie
Alastair Mackenzie as Justin / Andy / Freddy / Peter
Lyndsey Marshal as Sandy / X / Janice
Hugo Myatt as Dr. Culpepper / Leon Bank / Desk Sergeant
Tedy Necula as Marco Arkadin
Joe Reegan as James / Jack

Reception
Snuff. A horror film from 1975 that gained notoriety due to an outrageous PR stunt orchestrated by the film's producer and distributor, Alan Shackleton. The narrative about a murderous cult, inspired by the Manson Family, was originally named "The Slaughter." Shackleton took control of it and added a cliffhanger finale that made it seem like we were really seeing a murder unfold.

References

External links
 
 
 

2005 films
2005 horror films
British nonlinear narrative films
Films set in country houses
Films set in England
Gothic horror films
Films about snuff films
Films directed by Bernard Rose (director)
Films with screenplays by Bernard Rose (director)
Films produced by Donald Kushner
2000s British films